Coprofago is a technical death metal band formed by Sebastián Vergara, Pablo Alvarez, Pablo Solari and Ignacio Suit in Santiago, Chile, in June 1993. The name of the band is taken from the Greek "copro" ("feces") and "fago" ("eat").

Biography
Coprofago was formed while all founding members were still in school. They recorded a standard death metal demo that sold out immediately, attracting the attention of some magazines in Chile, but generally without good reviews. With the addition of Marcelo Ruiz on drums and Felipe Castro on bass guitar, the band released Images of Despair in 1997. Genesis, released in 2000, attracted more attention. They were invited to share the stage with the death metal band Krisiun, local the band Criminal and other Chilean bands. A growing reputation and praise from bands like Atheist, Darkane and Watchtower members led to a deal with the French record label Sekhmet, which released the Genesis album in Europe.

A few weeks before the European release, Ruiz and subsequently Solari moved to Sweden, which gave the band to a period of inactivity until mid-2003, when they started to write the music for their following album, Unorthodox Creative Criteria, released in July 2005. The album was a rather uncommon mixture of death metal and progressive rock, bordering at times on jazz fusion.

Band members

Current members
 Pablo Alvarez – guitar, keyboard, vocals (1993-2005, 2014-present)
 Sebastián Vergara – guitar, keyboard, vocals (1993-2005, 2014-present)
 Marcelo Ruiz – drums (1995-2005, 2014-present)
 Rodrigo Castro - bass (2000–2003, 2014-present)

Former members
 Felipe Castro – bass guitar (1998-1999, 2004–2005)
 Pablo Solari – bass guitar (1993–1998)
 Ignacio Suit – drums (1993–1995)

Timeline

Discography
 Images of Despair (1999)
 Genesis (2000)
 Unorthodox Creative Criteria (2005)

External links
 MySpace.com - Coprofago
 Encyclopaedia Metallum - Coprofago
 Coprofago - MetalStorm
 Coprofago – Music at Last.fm

Technical death metal musical groups
Chilean thrash metal musical groups
Chilean death metal musical groups
Musical groups established in 1993
Musical quartets
1993 establishments in Chile